The Romania national cricket team represents the country of Romania in international cricket. Cricket was played in Romania between 1893 and 1930, after which it declined and the sport in Romania died out. In recent years the game has begun to grow again, particularly in Bucharest, Timișoara and Cluj-Napoca. In July 2010, they played in a European Twenty20 tournament which was held in Skopje, Macedonia. On 29 June 2013, Romania was granted affiliate status by the International Cricket Council (ICC) and are therefore entitled to participate in ICC official events. Since 2017, they became an associate member

As in a number of European countries, the game is dominated by expatriates from the Sub-Continent and other traditional cricket-playing countries. The main ground of the team for national and international matches is at Moara Vlăsiei, 26 km (16 miles) away from the Bucharest city centre. It was built between 2011 and 2013 and is the only turf ground in eastern and central Europe.

Romania won the 2021 Sofia Twenty20 cup, where they defeated Bulgaria in the final.

History

2018-Present
In April 2018, the ICC decided to grant full Twenty20 International (T20I) status to all its members. Therefore, all Twenty20 matches played between Romania and other ICC members after 1 January 2019 will be a full T20I. 

Romania played its first T20I match against Austria on 29 August 2019 during the 2019 Continental Cup in Romania. 

Romania are scheduled to make their debut in an ICC event, when they take part in the Europe Qualifier tournament in 2021.

International grounds

Tournament History

Sofia Twenty20
2021: Champions

Continental Cup
2019: 3rd place
2021: Champions

Valletta Cup
2022: Champions

Records

International Match Summary — Romania
 
Last updated 19 July 2022.

Twenty20 International 

 Highest team total: 226/6 v. Turkey, 29 August 2019 at Moara Vlasiei Cricket Ground, Moara Vlăsiei
 Highest individual score: 110, Taranjeet Singh v. Czech Republic, 13 May 2022 at Marsa Sports Club, Marsa
 Best individual bowling figures: 5/30, Asif Bevinje v. Hungary, 3 September 2021 at Moara Vlasiei Cricket Ground, Moara Vlăsiei

Most T20I runs for Romania

Most T20I wickets for Romania

T20I record versus other nations

Records complete to T20I #1677. Last updated 19 July 2022.

See also
 List of Romania Twenty20 International cricketers

References

Cricket in Romania
Cricket
National cricket teams